Bacillus aerophilus is a species of bacteria first isolated from cryogenic tubes used for collecting air samples from high altitudes, hence its name. Its type strain is 28KT (=MTCC 7304T =JCM 13347T).

References

Further reading

Gowdhaman, Dharmalingam, et al. "Optimization of the xylanase production with the newly isolated Bacillus aerophilus KGJ2." TURKISH JOURNAL OF BIOCHEMISTRY-TURK BIYOKIMYA DERGISI 39.1 (2014): 70–77.

External links

LPSN

aerophilus
Bacteria described in 2006